Floyd Mayweather Jr. vs. Don Moore, billed as The Showcase in the Skies of Dubai, was an exhibition boxing match between former five-division world champion Floyd Mayweather Jr. and undefeated boxer Don Moore. It took place on May 21, 2022, at the Etihad Arena in Abu Dhabi, United Arab Emirates. The fight went the distance resulting in being a non-scored bout.

Background
The event was originally scheduled for May 14, 2022, but the event was postponed to May 21, 2022 due to the death of the president of the United Arab Emirates.

Mayweather fought an eight round exhibition bout with former sparring partner Don Moore at a boxing event in Abu Dhabi. The fight was one-sided and Mayweather was in full control of the meeting including dropping Moore with a punch to the body in the eighth round. Moore survived the knockdown and would go the full eight rounds, there was no scoring and it ended without an official verdict.

Fight card

References

Boxing matches
2022 in boxing
Boxing matches involving Floyd Mayweather Jr.
Sport in Abu Dhabi
Boxing in the United Arab Emirates